Quincy Brooks IV (born October 24, 1977), better known by his stage name San Quinn, is an American rapper from San Francisco, California. He is the cousin of Messy Marv, Stevie Johnson, and Ya Boy.

Early life
Brooks was born in Oakland, California, United States, and grew up in the Fillmore District of San Francisco since the age of three. He attended George Washington High School.

Career
Brooks made his first rap appearance as an opening act for 2Pac and Digital Underground at the age of 12.  He recorded his first album at 15 years old. In addition to a solo career, Brooks is also a member of the San Francisco rap group Get Low Playaz with JT The Bigga Figga, D-Moe, and Seff Tha Gaffla. One of Brooks' most notable tracks is "Shock the Party", which samples Whodini's "One Love".  The video for "Shock the Party" was filmed in the Fillmore district of San Francisco in the now-defunct Buena Vista Plaza East public housing towers, commonly referred to as OC (Outta Control) Housing Projects.

Discography

Studio albums

 1993: Young Baby Boy (Don't Cross Me)
 1995: Live N Direct
 1996: The Hustle Continues
 2001: The Mighty Quinn
 2004: I Give You My Word
 2006: The Rock: Pressure Makes Diamonds
 2007: Extreme Danger
 2008: From a Boy to a Man
 2009: The Tonite Show Addressing The Beef
 2011: The Redemption Of Quincy Brooks Volume 1
 2011: Can't Take The Ghetto Out A Nigga
 2011: G.O.D. Guns Oil And Drugs Recession Proof
 2013: What Goes Around Comes Around: Good Karma
 2014: Since 17 Reasons
 2015: The Fillmore Lion

Compilation albums

 1998: San Quinn Presents 17 Reasons Compilation
 1998: San Quinn Presents Isolated In The Game
 2001: 4.5.7. Is The Code
 2002: Repossessions
 2003: Mind Motion Presents The Done Deal Party
 2003: Quinndo Mania The Best Of San Quinn
 2005: 4.5.7. Is The Code Part 2
 2006: 4.5.7. Is The Code Part 3
 2007: San Quinn Presents The Color Of Money
 2011: Best Of Frisco Street Show
 2012: Giants & Elephants Radio Vol. 2 We Own The Streets
 2014: Street Platinum The Ultimate Album

Collaboration albums

 1998: Messy Marv & San Quinn - Explosive Mode
 2002: The Done Deal Fam - Runs In The Family
 2006: Assassin & San Quinn - Fillmoe 2 San Jo 2
 2006: C-Bo & San Quinn - 100 Racks In My Backpack
 2006: Messy Marv & San Quinn - Explosive Mode 2 Back In Business
 2006: The Mob Gets Explosive - Explosive Mode 3
 2007: San Quinn & T-Nutty - A Warrior And A King Lyrical Kingdom
 2008: JT The Bigga Figga, Messy Marv & San Quinn - Fillmoe Hardheads
 2008: All City - 41Feva
 2008: Keak Da Sneak & San Quinn - Welcome To Scokland
 2010: San Quinn & E.Klips Da Hustla - Detrimental
 2010: San Quinn & Loyal-T - Never Say Die
2010: San Quinn Presents - Miftape Muzik Volume 1
 2011: San Quinn & Tuf Luv - A Hustler's Hope
 2012: San Quinn & E.Klips Da Hustla - Detrimental 2 No Mercy
 2013: Berner & San Quinn - Cookies & Cream
 2013: San Quinn & Extreme - Red Cups & Poker Chips
 2015: San Quinn & Sav Abinitio - Money Talks
 2016: Neighborhood Connection & San Quinn - Spit It From The Lip
 2016: Berner, Rich Rocka aka Ya Boy & San Quinn - Guilty By Association 2: Criminal Enterprise

With Get Low Playaz

 1995: Straight Out The Labb
 1996: What We Known Fo
 1998: The Package 
 2000: The Family Business
 2006: In The Streets Of Fillmoe

Mixtapes

 2007: DJ Juice Presents Bay Area Mixtape Vol. 7 (Hosted By San Quinn)
 2010: I Never Left
 2012: The Mighty Vol.1
 2013: All In The City
 2013: The Mighty Vol.2
 2018: The Mighty, Vol. 3

Singles

2020: “Oh La Aye” (featuring Freeway, produced by Monk HTS)

References

External links

San Quinn Interview at Dubcnn

1978 births
African-American male rappers
Rappers from the San Francisco Bay Area
Hip hop musicians from San Francisco
Living people
Rappers from San Francisco
West Coast hip hop musicians
Gangsta rappers
21st-century American rappers
21st-century American male musicians
21st-century African-American musicians
20th-century African-American people